The 2002–03 season saw Hull City compete in the Football League Third Division where they finished in 13th position with 59 points. It was also Hull's final season at Boothferry Park as they moved to the KC Stadium in December 2002.

Final league table

Results
Hull City's score comes first

Legend

Football League Third Division

FA Cup

Football League Cup

Football League Trophy

Squad statistics

References

External links
 Hull City 2002–03 at Soccerbase.com (select relevant season from dropdown list)

2002–03
Hull City
2000s in Kingston upon Hull